Pilato may refer to:

 Pilato (surname), surname of Italian origin
 Pilato (rapper), the stage name of Zambian singer Fumba Chama

Places
 Spain
 Casa de Pilatos ("Pilate's House"), an Andalusian palace in Seville, Spain, which serves as the permanent residence of the Dukes of Medinaceli

 Italy
 Lago di Pilato, a lake in the Province of Ascoli Piceno, Marche, Italy.
 Grotte di Pilato, ("Grottoes of Pilate"), a complex system of tunnels and pools in the island of Ponza, Italy